John Rees-Evans (born April 1978) is a British politician who is currently the leader of the Five Star Direct Democracy Party.

Personal life 
Rees-Evans (who prefers to be known simply as "Evans") was born in Hampshire and educated both in the UK and overseas, including at the Jeppe High School for Boys in Johannesburg. He has a professional background in business, particularly in physical commodities dealing and adventure tourism.

Family 
Rees-Evans claims his family have been pro-equality campaigners for several centuries, citing the life of William Murray, 1st Earl of Mansfield, (the younger brother of Rees-Evans' six times great grandfather) who, controversially in the 18th century, adopted Dido, the illegitimate daughter of an African slave, educating her, raising her as his own daughter, having her live with the family for thirty years at Kenwood House and making her an heir; and Hugh Lewin, the nephew of Rees-Evans' great grandfather and an anti-apartheid activist campaigner and friend of Nelson Mandela. Hugh was imprisoned for 7 years, convicted on similar charges to Mandela.

Controversy 
Controversially, Rees-Evans once responded to the question posed by a self professed "anarchist" in Merthyr Tydfil as to whether he defended the claim made by another Christian political activist, Julia Gasper, that homosexuals enjoyed physical congress with animals, by claiming that he had seen evidence of this. The evidence that he cited - although he subsequently explained these remarks as being "playful banter" - was of a "homosexual donkey" trying to rape his horse.

Since it is sometimes said in South Wales that a donkey would be elected to Parliament at a General Election if it wore a red rosette (a reference to the concept of tribal voting), and since the incumbent Member of Parliament in the seat he was contesting is homosexual, Rees-Evans was accused of "dog whistle politics" by giving this response. However, Rees-Evans denied that he was referencing any individual, and claimed he was simply answering the question literally and playfully and that the questioner didn't specify that he was talking about homosexual humans; clarifying his response by saying "I was asked to respond to quite a bizarre statement ... and so I tried to give the only kind of answer I knew how to give because, frankly, I do not have any experience of homosexuality, or humans copulating with animals."

The donkey to which Rees-Evans referred was subsequently identified as "Marcello". Ownership of the donkey has not been established and it is known to be shared by a number of villagers. The donkey is thought by at least one villager who has looked after it for several weeks, not to be homosexual but at times to experience difficulty identifying the gender of other equines. It is noted that Rees-Evans' stallion was exceptionally well groomed when compared with the standards to which Marcello was accustomed, and that this fact may have contributed towards the confusion.

Political career 
He contested the seat of Cardiff South and Penarth in the 2015 general election, receiving 13.8% of the vote.

Rees-Evans has pledged to ensure that the government is reduced in size and function. He believes that the current political class in Westminster is out of touch with citizens, and pledged to make politics more transparent and open if elected.

Rees-Evans advocates the introduction of direct democracy with intention to cause massive reform of the entire UK political system. He also supports capital punishment for child killers and sexual abusers of children.

Rees-Evans once announced a proposal to offer £9,000 and health insurance to Britons with dual nationality, in return for them moving to countries where they have the right, or could obtain the right, to settle. They would be required to start a business and trade with the UK, exporting products that the UK did not manufacture. This would be to help achieve "negative net immigration towards one million a year" and would reduce UK living costs. He was condemned by Liberal Democrat MP Tom Brake who compared the proposal to the BNP's manifesto, however, when interviewed by Asian Voice, Rees-Evans explained that the initiative was inspired by the decision of his father in the late 1970's to leave the UK to start a business in Africa, that there was nothing in his original comments that in any way alluded to the race of prospective candidates, and that this inference was deliberately manufactured without justification by his political opponents to discredit his views.

In 2017 with Robert Ainsworth, Rees-Evans helped form a direct democracy advocacy group called "Affinity" and later the same year founded the Democrats and Veterans party and was elected the leader of the party. The party has since been renamed the 5 Star Direct Democracy Party.

References 

1978 births
Living people
Fellows of the Royal Geographical Society
Politicians from Hampshire
Leaders of political parties in the United Kingdom